Ronald José Hernández Pimentel (born 21 September 1997) is a Venezuelan professional footballer who plays as a right-back for Major League Soccer club Atlanta United and the Venezuela national team. He previously played for Zamora in Venezuela, Stabæk in Norway and Aberdeen in Scotland.

Club career

Early career
On 17 August 2017, Hernández signed for Norwegian side Stabæk.

Aberdeen
On 31 January 2020, Hernández signed for Scottish top-flight team Aberdeen on a four-and-a-half year deal. In doing so, he became the club's first ever Venezuelan player. Hernández failed to settle in Scotland with the COVID-19 pandemic starting shortly after his arrival at the club. He made six appearances for Aberdeen, all in the Scottish Premiership, before leaving the club on compassionate leave in December 2020 to be with his family in Venezuela. He was then subsequently linked with a move to MLS club Atlanta United, with whom Aberdeen have a strategic partnership.

Atlanta United (loan)
On 18 February 2021, Hernández signed with Major League Soccer club Atlanta United on loan for the 2021 season. He made his debut for Atlanta United's reserve affiliate, Atlanta United 2, on 1 May against OKC Energy, starting in the 1–0 victory. Hernández then made his Atlanta United debut on 3 July in a 3–0 defeat against the Chicago Fire, coming on as a substitute for George Bello. On 21 July, Hernández scored his first goal for Atlanta United in a 1–1 draw against FC Cincinnati. On 17 January 2022, Aberdeen confirmed Hernández had signed for Atlanta United for a "substantial transfer fee".

International career
Hernández was called up to the Venezuela under-20 side for the 2017 FIFA U-20 World Cup.

Career statistics

Club

International

Scores and results list Venezuela's goal tally first, score column indicates score after each Hernández goal.

Honours 
Venezuela U20
 FIFA U-20 World Cup: Runner-up 2017
 South American Youth Football Championship: Third Place 2017

References

1997 births
Living people
Venezuelan footballers
Association football defenders
Venezuela international footballers
Venezuela youth international footballers
Venezuela under-20 international footballers
Venezuelan Primera División players
Eliteserien players
Scottish Professional Football League players
Zamora FC players
Stabæk Fotball players
Aberdeen F.C. players
Atlanta United FC players
2019 Copa América players
2021 Copa América players
Venezuelan expatriate footballers
Venezuelan expatriate sportspeople in Norway
Expatriate footballers in Norway
Venezuelan expatriate sportspeople in Scotland
Expatriate footballers in Scotland
Major League Soccer players
People from Barinas (state)